Douglas Central is a House of Keys constituency in the east of the Isle of Man. It was created for the 2016 general election and elects 2 MHKs.

Elections

Constituencies of the Isle of Man
Constituencies established in 2016
2016 establishments in the Isle of Man